Massimo Panizzi (born October 10, 1962) is an Italian Army Major General who currently serves as the Deputy Commander of the Military Command of the Capital in Rome. He previously served as the Italian Deputy Military Representative to the NATO Military Committee and Chief of the NATO Office of the Italian Military Delegation at NATO HQ, Brussels. 
He participated in numerous international military operations and he has served as the Deputy Chief of Staff Support (DCOS SPT) for the NATO Resolute Support Mission in Kabul. 
He assumed his current assignment on September 19, 2022.

Early life and education
Massimo Panizzi was born in Marina di Carrara, in Tuscany, Italy on October 10, 1962. He attended the Military Academy of Modena, he graduated from the University of Turin and he was commissioned into the Italian Army in 1981, becoming an Alpini Officer. He attended the Defence Staff College in Rome, the Centre for High Military Studies and the Institute for High Studies of the National Defense in Paris, the NATO Defence College Degree NameGenerals, Flag Officers and Ambassadors' Course (GFOAC). He holds University bachelor's degrees in Pedagogy, Strategic Sciences, International and Diplomatic Relations, and is journalist with expertise in Marketing & Communications. He has contributed to a number of publications and studies.

Military career
In a career spanning almost forty years, Massimo Panizzi has commanded Alpini units at every rank from Lieutenant to Brigadier-General, including the “Susa” Battalion of Pinerolo the 8th Alpini Regiment of Cividale del Friuli – the operational unit of the European Union Battle Group – and the Alpini Brigade Taurinense in Turin transforming it into a key European French-Italian Brigade HQ.
As a Senior Staff Officer, he led the Press Offices of the Italian Army General Staff and of the Italian Ministry of Defence, where he introduced the first Italian Ministerial Policy on Strategic Communication. He also served as Spokesperson and Strategic Communication Advisor to the Chairman of the NATO Military Committee and the NATO International Military Staff. On 2004 he has published research on the relations between military and Non-Governmental Organizations in the Crisis Response Operations 
and, on 2010, he elaborated the NATO Military Public Affairs Policy. He also was deputy commander of the Training Command and Application School of the Army, situated in Turin, where he was responsible for the training, education and specialization of all Italian Army Officers.
Panizzi has served on a number of overseas missions and operations, including Bosnia and Herzegovina with both NATO IFOR and SFOR, Kosovo with NATO KFOR, and Irak as part of Operation Ancient Babylon serving in the HQ of the US-led Multinational Corps Irak, and most recently in Afghanistan where he was Deputy Chief of Staff Support (DCOS SPT) for the NATO Resolute Support Mission in Kabul.
Panizzi is the recipient of a number of honours and awards, including Commendatore Ordine al Merito della Repubblica Italiana, the French Chevalier de la Légion d’Honneur and the US Legion of Merit.
From Sept 2019 to Sept 2022 Major General Panizzi has served as the Italian Deputy Military Representative and Head of the NATO Office to the Italian Military Delegation at NATO HQ, Brussels.
He assumed the assignment of Deputy Commander of the Military Command of the Capital in Rome on September 19, 2022.

Awards and decorations

References

1962 births
Living people
Italian soldiers